Kenneth Roy Norman FBA (1925–2020) was a British philologist. He was Professor Emeritus of Indian Studies at the University of Cambridge, and was a leading authority on Pali and other Middle Indo-Aryan languages.

Life
Norman was educated at Taunton School in Somerset. After military service in India and Malaya, he was admitted to Downing College, Cambridge, where he studied classics, receiving his M.A. in 1954.

The whole of his academic career was spent at Cambridge. He was appointed Lecturer in Indian Studies in 1955, Reader in 1978, and Professor of Indian Studies in 1990. He retired in 1992.

From 1981 to 1994 he was President of the Pali Text Society, and from January to March 1994 he was the Bukkyō Dendō Kyōkai Visiting Professor at the School of Oriental and African Studies.

He was made a Foreign Member of the Royal Danish Academy of Sciences and Letters in 1983 and a Fellow of the British Academy in 1985.

Notable works

Translations
Elders' Verses: Vol. I (1969, 2nd ed. 2007), a translation of the Theragāthā
Elders' Verses: Vol. II (1971, 2nd ed. 2007), a translation of the Therīgāthā
The Word of the Doctrine (1991), a translation of the Dhammapada
The Group of Discourses (1992, 2nd ed. 2001), a translation of the Suttanipāta
Pātimokkha (2001), a translation of the Pātimokkha
Overcoming Doubts: Vol. I: The Bhikkhu-Pātimokkha Commentary (with P. Kieffer-Pülz and W. Pruitt, 2018), a translation of the Kaṅkhāvitaraṇī

Other books
Pali Literature (1983)
A Philological Approach to Buddhism: The Bukkyō Dendō Kyōkai Lectures 1994 (1997)
Collected Papers: Vols. IVIII (19902007)

Papers
Samprasāraṇa in Middle Indo-Aryan (1958)
Notes on Aśoka's Fifth Pillar Edict (1967)
Dr. Bimala Churn Law (1969)
Some Aspects of the Phonology of the Prakrit Underlying the Aśokan Inscriptions (1970)
Notes on the Bahapur Version of Aśoka's Minor Rock Edict (1971)
Notes on the Greek Version of Aśoka's Twelfth and Thirteenth Rock Edicts (1972)
Aśoka and Capital Punishment: Notes on a Portion of Aśoka's Fourth Pillar Edict, with an Appendix on the Accusative Absolute Construction (1975)
Two Pali Etymologies (1979)
A Note on Attā in the Alagaddūpama-sutta (1981)
The Nine Treasures of the Cakravartin (1983)
The Pāli Language and the Theravādin Tradition (1983)
The Pratyeka-Buddha in Buddhism and Jainism (1983)
The Origin of Pāli and Its Position among the Indo-European Languages (1988)
Aspects of Early Buddhism (1990)
Pāli Philology and the Study of Buddhism (1990)
Studies in the Minor Rock Edicts of Aśoka (1991)
On Translating from Pāli (1992)
Theravāda Buddhism and Brahmanical Hinduism: Brahmanical Terms in a Buddhist Guise (1992)
‘ Solitary as Rhinoceros Horn ’ (1996)
The Four Noble Truths (2003)
Why are the Four Noble Truths Called “Noble”? (2008)

Notes

References

1925 births
2020 deaths
Alumni of Downing College, Cambridge
British Indologists
British orientalists
British philologists
Fellows of the British Academy
Linguists of Pali
Pali
People educated at Taunton School